The Museum für Luftfahrt und Technik Wernigerode is an aviation museum located in the German town of Wernigerode near Halberstadt. Many aerospace exhibits are on display including fixed-wing aircraft, helicopters and aircraft engines. The main display is contained within two buildings with some aircraft displayed externally. In addition to the aircraft exhibits a number of cockpit sections and a collection of ejection seats are also held by the museum.

History
The museum opened to the public on 1 June 1999. In 2016, the museum opened two new buildings with a total of 2,100 square meters.

Aircraft on display
The museum has over 45 aircraft on display and over 1,000 exhibit items.

Piston engine aircraft
Antonov An-2R 1G 194-27
Dornier Do 27B-1 56+18
Dornier Do 28D-1 4033
LET Aero 45S 04-013
Nord 1101 81
Piaggio P.149
Zlín Z-37A 1920

Turboprop aircraft
Transall C-160 51+01

Jet aircraft

BAC Jet Provost T4 XS217
Canadair Sabre JB-112
Dassault Mirage IIIRS 17-26-145
de Havilland Venom J-1635
Fiat G.91 BD+248
Hawker Hunter F.4 WV276
Lockheed T-33A 95+20
Lockheed F-104G Starfighter 20+07
Lockheed F-104G Starfighter 22+45
Lockheed F-104G Starfighter 23+09
Mikoyan-Gurevich MiG-21 SPS 22+22
Mikoyan-Gurevich MiG-23 MF 20+06

Gliders
Scheibe L-Spatz

Helicopters
Aerospatiale Alouette II
Aerospatiale Alouette III
Bell UH-1D
Hughes 269
MBB Bo 105CB 139
Mil Mi-2 543620074
Westland Whirlwind HAR.10 XP339

Aircraft engines

Piston engines
Avia M462
Shvetsov ASh-82
Wright R-1300

Gas turbine engines

Allison J33
Bristol Siddeley Orpheus
General Electric J79
Klimov GTD-350
Rolls-Royce Avon
Rolls-Royce Tyne
SNECMA Atar
Turbomeca Marboré

See also
List of aerospace museums

References
Notes

External links

Museum für Luftfahrt und Technik Wernigerode
Museum für Luftfahrt und Technik Wernigerode - Panoramic image viewer

Aerospace museums in Germany
Museums in Saxony-Anhalt
Museums established in 1999
Museum fur Luftfahrt und Technik